The Grapevine Hills are a low mountain range within Anza-Borrego Desert State Park in the Colorado Desert, in eastern San Diego County, southern California.

References 

Mountain ranges of the Colorado Desert
Mountain ranges of San Diego County, California
Anza-Borrego Desert State Park
Hills of California
Mountain ranges of Southern California